Getta niveifascia is a moth of the  family Notodontidae. It is found in the Amazonian region of South America, including French Guiana.

Larvae have been reared on Passiflora candida.

External links
Species page at Tree of Life project

Notodontidae of South America
Moths described in 1864